Albula pacifica also known as the Pacific shafted bonefish is a species of fish native to the eastern Pacific.

History
Bonefish were once believed to be a single species with a global distribution, however 9 different species have since been identified. There are three identified species in the Atlantic and six in the Pacific.

References

Albuliformes
Taxa named by William Beebe
Fish of the Pacific Ocean
Fish described in 1942